This is a list of characters from the Bob the Builder and the 2015 reboot television series.

Humans

Main

Original series
Bob (voiced by Neil Morrissey in the UK and by William Dufris in Seasons 1–9, Greg Proops in Seasons 10–13 and by Marc Silk in Seasons 14-16 and Ready, Steady, Build! in the US in the original series; voiced by Lee Ingleby in the UK and by Colin Murdock in the US in the reboot series) is a builder and head of his own construction yard based in Bobsville and later in Sunflower Valley and now Fixham Harbour. Bob is from a family of builders – his father Robert is also a builder and so was his grandfather Billy. He is assisted by Wendy and a host of anthropomorphic vehicles in various projects in and around the town. He is the owner of Pilchard and he is not good with computers. Some of the problems in the show arise from Bob's habit of forgetting to turn his mobile phone on. His catchphrases are "Right, team, can we fix it?", "Morning, team!" and "Can we build it?" in the reboot series.
Wendy (voiced by Kate Harbour in the UK and by Lorelei King in the US and by Joanne Froggatt in the reboot series) is Bob's business partner who runs the office and keeps the business in order, and often organizes tools and equipment. She is also seen doing construction work in many episodes. Wendy is often worried about Bob's cat, Pilchard, as shown in the episode "Pilchard in a Pickle" and in the song "Find That Cat".

Reboot series
Leo (voiced by Jacob Scipio in the UK and Daniel Bacon in the US) is a college student, Bob's apprentice and Curtis' son.

Recurring

Original series
Farmer Percy Pickles (voiced by Neil Morrisey in the UK and by William Dufris and Vincent Marzello in the US and by Nick Mercer in the reboot series) is a nearby farmer, and a good friend of Bob who often helps out in his construction projects. He is the owner of Travis, Sumsy, Packer, Scruffty, and Spud.
Mr. Bernard Bentley (voiced by Rob Rackstraw in the UK, the US version beginning with Project: Build It, and by Alan Marriott in Seasons 3-9 in the US version of the original series; voiced by Nick Mercer in the UK and by Ian James Corlett in the US in the reboot series) is Bobsville's building inspector and later Mayor of Sunflower Valley and then Fixham Harbour's building inspector, and Barbara Bentley's husband. His original catchphrase is "Oh my word!" In the reboot series, he is the mayor's right-hand man and gains a more nerdy, clumsy personality and a brand new catchphrase which is "Oh, dear me! Mayor Madison will be here any second!"
Mr. Bill Beasley (voiced by Rob Rackstraw in the UK and by William Dufris in Seasons 4–9, Greg Proops in Seasons 10–13, and Marc Silk in Seasons 14–16 in the US) is a clumsy and bit indecisive Bobsville later Sunflower Valley resident and a frequent customer for Bob and his team.
Mrs. Barbara Bentley (voiced by Kate Harbour in the UK and Lorelei King in the US) is Mr. Bentley's wife and a friend of Bob and the team.
Mr. Benjamin Dixon (voiced by Rob Rackstraw in the UK and by Alan Marriott in the US) is Bobsville's local postman.
Mr. Jeremy Ellis (voiced by Rob Rackstraw in the UK and by William Dufris in the US in the original series and Alan Marriott in the US version of the Project: Build It series in the episode, "Scrambler and the Colorful Cave") is the manager of the Bobsville museum. 
J.J. (voiced by Colin McFarlane) is the manager of the suppliers yard, the owner of Skip and Trix, and the new owner of Hamish.
Molly (voiced by Llewella Gideon in the UK and Lachele Carl in the US) is J.J.'s daughter who helps him out in the suppliers yard.
Mrs. Gill Percival (voiced by Kate Harbour in the UK and Lorelei King in the US) is Bobsville's local school headteacher.
Mrs. Faye Potts (voiced by Kate Harbour in the UK and Lorelei King in the US) is a Bobsville resident and the owner of Tommy the Tortoise.
Mr. Angelo Sabatini (voiced by Neil Morrissey in the UK, William Dufris in the US in the original series and Vincent Marzello in the US in the Project: Build It Series) is the owner and chef of the local pizza shop in Bobsville and the Sunflower Valley bakery.
Robert (voiced by Richard Briers in the UK and Vincent Marzello in the US) is Bob and Tom's father, Dot's husband and a retired builder, who built most of Bobsville, which was named after himself. He first appeared in The Knights of Can-a-Lot, when he helped Bob and the team restore an old castle. He later took the building jobs in Bobsville while the team were in Sunflower Valley.
Dot (voiced by June Whitfield in the UK and Lorelei King in the US) is Bob and Tom's mother and Robert's wife. She first appeared in The Knights of Can-a-Lot. She later took over Wendy's old job as the secretary at the Bobsville building yard while the team were in Sunflower Valley.

Project: Build It
Annie Pickles (voiced by Kate Harbour in the UK and Lorelei King in the US) is a seaweed farmer and Farmer Pickles' cousin.
Megan (known as Meg) (voiced by Kate Harbour) is a dairy farmer, Piper's aunt and Dodger's owner.
Baz (voiced by Kate Harbour) is a sheep shearer and Farmer Pickles' cousin.
Pablo Sabatini is Mr. Sabatini's brother, Sophia Sabatini's brother-in-law and Carlo and Cassia Sabatini's uncle.
Sunny (voiced by Rupert Degas) is Marjorie's son and Saffron's twin brother.
Saffron (voiced by Emma Tate) is Marjorie's daughter and Sunny twin sister.
Carlo (voiced by Rupert Degas) and Cassia Sabatini (voiced by Emma Tate) is Mr. and Mrs. Sabatini's twins. 
Piper McDonald (voiced by Rupert Degas) is Meg's nephew who assists her with her dairy products.

Ready, Steady, Build!
Brad Rad (voiced by Rupert Degas) is the owner of Fixham Harbour's surf school down by the beach.
Mr. David Mockney (voiced by Rupert Degas) is the manager of the Fixham Harbour museum. His name is a reference to British artist David Hockney.
Mrs. Toosie is the owner of Fixham Harbour's local toy shop.

Reboot series
Mayor Madison (voiced by Lucy Montgomery in the UK and Nicole Oliver in the US) is the mayor of Spring City. A running gag is she occasionally tries to get her picture taken for the newspaper or a magazine and it always gets ruined. For example, in "Sky-High Scoop", she tries to get her picture taken at the top of the new skyscraper and Gull lands on her and she tries to shoo her away.
Curtis (voiced by Danny John-Jules) is Leo's father and the owner of the local service station.
Brandon (voiced by Vincent Tong) is one of the Spring City Rockets.
Mila (voiced by Holly Hazelton in the UK and Rebecca Shoichet in the US) is one of the Spring City Rockets.
J.J. (voiced by William Haresceugh in the UK and Erin Mathews in the US) is one of the Spring City Rockets.
Saffi (voiced by Mia Hope in the UK and Kazumi Evans in the US) is one of the Spring City Rockets whose hair is tied in pigtails. She is also a pet owner who has South-Asian blood.
Chef Tattie (voiced by Iain Lauchlan) is a celebrity chef.
Anish Bose (voiced by Kulvinder Ghir) is an archaeologist.
Jenny Dobbs (voiced by Lucy Montgomery) is a zookeeper at Fixham Zoo who looks after zoo animals.
Vet Tilly (voiced by Sarah Hadland in the UK and Erin Mathews in the US) is a vet who helps pet animals feel better.

Minor

Original series
David Dixon (voiced by Neil Morrisey in the UK and Alan Marriott in the US) is a famous football goalkeeper and Mr. Dixon's brother.
Bunty Ferguson (voiced by Alison Steadman in the UK and Lorelei King in the US) is the mayor of Bobsville who appeared in two episodes.
Dr. Florence Mountfitchet (voiced by Brenda Blethyn in the UK and Lorelei King in the US) is a member of Local Heritage. She appears in The Knights of Can-a-Lot, when she asked Bob and the team restore an old castle.
Mr. Adam Fothergill (voiced by Neil Morrissey in the UK and Alan Marriott in the US) is a Bobsville resident, the computer repairman and Hamish's first owner. He gave Hamish to J.J. and Molly after he discovered that he was allergic to him.
Jenny (voiced by Kate Harbour in the UK and Lorelei King in the US) is Wendy's sister.
Pam Goody is the manager of the Arts Centre.
Tom (voiced by Stephen Tompkinson in the UK and Rupert Degas in the US) is Bob's fraternal twin brother who works as a zoologist.
Mrs. Sophia Sabatini is Mr. Sabatini's wife.
Lennie Lazenby (voiced by Chris Evans in the UK and the US dub of A Christmas to Remember and Alan Marriott in the US dub of "Roley and the Rock Star") is Bobsville's resident rock star and guitarist and lead singer of "Lennie and the Lazers".
Banger (voiced by Noddy Holder) is Lennie and the Lazers' roadie.
Jana von Strudel (voiced by Ulrika Jonsson) is an Austrian yodeler, the host of the Bobblesberg Winter Games and the former owner of Zoomer.
Mrs. Bridget Beasley (voiced by Kate Harbour in the UK and Lorelei King in the US) is Mr. Beasley's wife.

Project: Build It
Marjorie (voiced by Emma Tate) is the manager at Farmer Pickles' sunflower factory.

Ready, Steady, Build!
Tony Toberomi is the manager of the Dinosaur Fun Park.
Pirate Brickbeard (voiced by Rupert Degas) is a pirate who founded Fixham Harbour and sails in a ship called The Bony Beard. He is believed to have a hidden a golden hammer in Fixham. His catchphrase is "No one will ever find my Golden Hammer! Har har!"

Reboot series
Conrad (voiced by Brian Cox) is a former builder and Ace, Crunch and Thud's former owner. He appears in "Mega Machines" when he helped Bob and the team build Spring City's new dam. But he was angry when Bob was given the job, so he attempted to sabotage the dam to make Bob look bad and take over the build himself. He was defeated and sentenced to community service.
Henry works at the race track for horses.
Roland works at the warehouse.
Dash Lightning (voiced by Steven Kynman) is the star of children's TV and film shows. Dash is well known for his catchphrase "With a Zoom! Boom! Lightning strikes twice!" Dash has a passion for tools and equipment and consequently is in awe of Bob.
Mei Moon works at the observatory.
Maneesh is an archeologist and Saffi's father.

Vehicles

Bob's vehicles

Construction vehicles

Original series
Scoop (voiced by Rob Rackstraw in the UK and by Alan Marriott in Seasons 1-16 and David Menkin in the US and by Blake Harrison in the reboot series) is a yellow backhoe loader and is the unspoken leader of Bob's machines. He has a habit of making jokes, and assists Bob in being in charge whenever extra help is needed. His catchphrases are "I can dig it!", "I'm in charge!", "No prob, Bob!", "Can we fix/build it?" and "Aww...I've just had a BRILLIANT IDEA!!!" in the reboot series. He is based on a JCB 3CX.
Muck (voiced by Rob Rackstraw in the UK and by Lachele Carl and Sophie Aldred in the US, and by Paul Painting in the UK and by Vincent Tong in the US in the reboot series) is a red bulldozer/dump truck hybrid, and is one of the heaviest machines who gets very clumsy for certain things. He is especially fond of getting dirty hence the name. His catchphrases are "Muck to the rescue!", "Let's get mucky!" and "Oh, wow! I'd love to join in!" in the reboot series. Muck is the only character to have had a gender switch between the UK and US dub in the original series, but was characterised as male in both versions of the reboot. Muck also does not resemble a realistic machine as of this point.
Dizzy (voiced by Kate Harbour in the UK and by Maria Darling and by Emma Tate in the US; voiced by Sarah Hadland in the UK and by Claire Corlett in the US in the reboot series) is an orange tilting drum cement mixer and the second youngest member of the team. She is eager, curious and easily excitable. Her catchphrases are "I can mix it!", and "Brilliant!" "Pour to perfection." in the reboot series.
Roley (voiced by Neil Morrissey in the UK and by Maria Darling in Series 1-15 and by Lorelei King in Season 16 and Ready, Steady, Build! in the US; voiced by Marcel McCalla in the UK and by Ian James Corlett in the US in the reboot series) is a green road roller that loves to make up songs and frequently spins his eyes when he is excited. He often acts before he thinks sometimes because of his heavy weight, which could lead to trouble. His catchphrases are "I can roll it!", "Rock and roll!/Rockin' and a rollin'!" and "The tarmac is flat!" in the reboot series.
Lofty (voiced by Neil Morrissey in the UK and by Sonya Leite in Seasons 1-9, Emma Tate in Seasons 10-16, and by Lizzie Waterworth in Ready, Steady, Build! in the US; voiced by Steven Kynman in the UK and by Richard Ian Cox in the US in the reboot series) is a blue mobile crane who lacks the confidence shown by the others. He is hesitant and cowardly, but with the encouragement of the team comes through in the end. His catchphrases are "I can lift it.", "Uh, yeah, I think so!", usually said in response to the question "Can we fix it?" and "It's a good job well done." in the reboot series.
Benny (voiced by Emma Tate) is a small magenta compact tracked loader. He was first seen in Snowed Under! The Bobblesberg Winter Games, when he helped Bob and the team get everything ready for the Bobblesberg Winter Games. He was later hired by Robert to help him out in Bobsville while the team were in Sunflower Valley, and even helped them out on a few jobs. He looks up to Scoop and calls him "Big Banana". His catchphrase is "Unreal, banana peel!" in reference to Scoop's yellow colour.

Ready, Steady, Build!
Scratch (voiced by Kate Harbour in the UK and Jo Wyatt in the US) is a small light blue skid-steer loader who is the youngest of the team. He is curious, eager, a bit childish and very naive, and still has a lot to learn such as learning to stand up for himself and asking for help.

Quadbikes

Project: Build It
Scrambler (voiced by Rupert Degas) is a dark blue quadbike who was won by Bob in the Sunflower Valley competition. He is very energetic and loves to go off-roading. He can sometimes be mischievous and impatient, but always learns his lessons in the end. His catchphrases are "Let's scram!", "Awesome!", "Wicked!", "Jump on, we'll be/get there in Scrambler time!" and "Cool as a mule!"

Farmer Pickles' vehicles

Original series
Travis (voiced by Rob Rackstraw in the UK and by Alan Marriott and by David Menkin in the US) is a turquoise tractor who belongs to Farmer Pickles and is often seen pulling a wood sided trailer. He helps out Bob and the team when they need it and keeps an eye on Spud. Travis is very careful and has never whined about a job. His catchphrases are "Travis Tractor's my name, moving loads is my game.", "Don't be silly, Spud.", and "I'd better get going!"

Project: Build It
Sumsy (voiced by Kate Harbour in the UK and Lorelei King in the US) is a maroon forklift with yellow stripes who belongs to Farmer Pickles and works at his sunflower factory. She looks almost identical to Trix. Her catchphrase is "I can pack 'em, I can stack 'em!"
Packer (voiced by Rob Rackstraw in the UK and Lorelei King in the US) is a red semi-trailer truck who belongs to Farmer Pickles and uses a flatbed and a covered trailer to make deliveries all over Sunflower Valley and later Fixham Harbour. His catchphrases are "Fetch/pick up and deliver! Fetch/pick up and deliver!" and "Pack me up and watch me go-go!"

J.J.'s vehicles

Original series
Skip (voiced by Colin McFarlane in the UK and by William Dufris and Rupert Degas in the US) is a lime green skip lorry who belongs to J.J..
Trix (voiced by Llewella Gideon in the UK and Maria Darling in the US) is a violet forklift who belongs to J.J..

Bobland Bay vehicles

Project: Build It
Tumbler (voiced by Rupert Degas in the UK and Vincent Marzello in the US) is a large cement mixer truck and the loudest machine on Bob's team. He is very noisy and due to his large size, he thinks he is strong, brave, and tough. He is prideful and tends to brag about his size, but he has got a gentle side, which he shows to his friends, particularly Dizzy. His catchphrase is "Rumblin' and a tumblin'!"
Gripper (voiced by Rupert Degas) and Grabber (voiced by Rob Rackstraw) are twin machines. Gripper is a dark orange and green mobile crane and Grabber is a dark green and orange excavator/bulldozer hybrid. They speak with a Scouse accent (Southern drawl in US dub). Gripper and Grabber refer to the other characters as "mates" ("partners" in the US dub) mainly due to stereotypical behaviours. They first appeared in Race to the Finish, when they helped Bob and the team build Sunflower Valley's new sports stadium. In Ready, Steady, Build!, they work at the suppliers yard in Fixahm Harbour. Their catchphrase is "Gripper and Grabber, having fun together!"

Snow vehicles

Original series
Scoot (voiced by Maria Darling) is a yellow snowmobile who belongs to Tom, who uses her to drive around the Arctic Circle. She was only seen in A Christmas to Remember. Her catchphrase is "Speedster Scoot hits the track! Whoo-hoo!"
Zoomer (voiced by Rupert Degas) is a purple snowmobile with a yellow lightning bolt who belongs to Jana. He was first seen in Snowed Under! The Bobblesberg Winter Games, when he helped Bob and the team get everything ready for the Bobblesberg Winter Games. He was later brought to Sunflower Valley to help out the team on snowy days. Zoomer's personality is very similar to Scrambler's. Like Scrambler, he makes noises when he's going fast. Although, he says "zoom" repeatedly while Scrambler says "nnnnnnneeeeoooowww".

Trucks

Project: Build It
Flex (voiced by Rupert Degas in the UK and Vincent Marzello in the US) is a light yellow cherry picker who tends to have an extensive knowledge of plants and loves horticulture and has a Northern Irish accent. His catchphrase is "Ducking Down, swinging around, reaching for the sky, my clever flexible arm can go anywhere!"
Bristle (voiced by Rupert Degas in the UK and Marc Silk in the US) is a silver and dark blue street sweeper who is very eager to help out the others by doing jobs often ahead of the team. Bristle seems to whistle very often. He also tends to be a neat freak. His catchphrase is "Clean as a whistle Bristle, that's me!"
Jackaroo (voiced by Donny Osmond) is a blue pickup truck that lives in the Wild West. He is only seen in Built to Be Wild. His catchphrases are "Hot diggity dog!" and "Jumping jackrabbits!"

Other

Project: Build It
Dodger (voiced by Rob Rackstraw in the UK and Alan Marriott in the US) is a white and blue pickup truck who belongs to Meg. He has a crane arm that lifts the milk. His horn makes strange honking sounds that the rest of the team find funny. His catchphrase is "Dodger delivers!"
Splasher (voiced by Rob Rackstraw) is a yellow and blue amphibious car who takes people to and from the Bobland Bay hotel and gives them tours in the valley. His catchphrase is "Never fear, Super Splasher is here!"
R. Vee (voiced by Rob Rackstraw in the UK and Marc Silk in the US) is a blue building van who used to be Robert and Dot's own mobile workshop and is currently their transportation and tool carrier. He is only seen in Scrambler to the Rescue.

Construction vehicles

Ready, Steady, Build!
Rubble (voiced by Rupert Degas in the UK and Marc Silk in the US) is an intelligent gold haul truck who helps Bob and the team to build Fixham Harbour's new Dinosaur Fun Park in The Big Dino Dig.

Reboot series

Construction vehicles
 Tiny (voiced by Terry Mynott in the UK and Lee Tockar in the US) is a yellow tower crane. His catchphrase is "Time for some Tower Power!" 
 Stretch (voiced by Sam Swann in the UK and Peter New in the US) is a teal excavator. His catchphrase is "I'm ready to work, Bob. Anytime, anywhere, any place".
 Rocky (voiced by Rasmus Hardiker) is a white compact loader who helped Bob and the team with an obstacle course for animals.

Mega Machines
Ace (voiced by Ben Miles in the UK and the US in Mega Machines, and by Brian Drummond is the US) is a giant orange front loader. He originally belonged to Conrad, until Bob took him in. His catchphrase is "Let's do this!"
Crunch (voiced by Brian Cox in Mega Machines, and by Dustin Demri-Burns in the series) is a giant white excavator who communicates with grunting sounds. He originally belonged to Conrad, until Bob took him in.
Thud (voiced by Dustin Demri-Burns in the UK and Brian Dobson in the US) is a giant dark blue haul truck. He originally belonged to Conrad, until Bob took him in.
Norm (voiced by Dustin Demri-Burns) is a giant light blue tunnel-drilling machine whose only spoken dialogue is his catchphrase, "Dig, Dig, Tunnel, Tunnel!"

Trucks
Two-Tonne (voiced by Terry Mynott in the UK and Richard Newman in the US) is a big navy blue tractor unit. He has four trailers, a flatbed (which has a crane on it), a low loader used for carrying things, as well as Stretch, a concrete mixer trailer, and a dumper trailer used for construction work. His catchphrase is "You can depend on me, Bob".
Alfred (voiced by Phill Cornwell) is Curtis' white and red tow truck who gets a bit overexcited sometimes, like when Leo plays video games. His catchphrase is "It's really fantastic, actually!"
Tread (voiced by Dustin Demri-Burns in the UK and Ryan Bell in the US) is an orange pickup truck who is cheerful and trusty. His catchphrase is "I love being busy!", only in the UK.
Shifter (voiced by Lucy Montgomery in the UK and Sam Vincent in the US) is a lime green piggyback forklift truck who causes chaos with his energetic enthusiasm. His catchphrase is "If you want it shifted, call for Shifter!"
Picksy (voiced by Teresa Gallagher) is a red cherry picker whom Lofty has a crush on.

Other
Betsy (voiced by Sarah Hadland in the UK and Rebecca Shoichet in the US) is a turquoise and white minibus who drives around the Spring City Rockets. Her catchphrase is "Come on, jump in, Rockets!"
Phillip (voiced by Steve Cannon) is a navy blue limousine who drives around Mayor Madison and Mr. Bentley. He loves his job and takes it very seriously.

Animals

Main

Original series
Pilchard (voiced by Kate Harbour) is Bob's pet cat. She often finds herself in problematic situations, like making her way into the middle of a construction job, which may or may not be on purpose.
Scruffty (voiced by Neil Morrissey) is Farmer Pickles' dog who lives on his farm.
Bird (voiced by Kate Harbour) is a blue and red, five feathered bird who is Roley's best friend and Pilchard's usual buddy.

Reboot series
Gull is a seagull who is Scoop's best friend.

Recurring

Original series
Finn is Bob's goldfish who likes to swim around in a fish tank.
Tommy is Mrs Potts' tortoise, who has had him since she was a little girl.
Hamish (voiced by Rob Rackstraw in the UK, and by Alan Marriott in the US) is J.J.'s (formerly Mr. Fothergill's) parrot who likes to repeat what he hears people say.
Squawk is a crow that torments Spud.
Humpty is Farmer Pickles' prize pig.
Pogo (voiced by Stephen Tompkinson) is Tom's husky.

Project: Build It
Sprat is Rupert Reekie's pet cat and Pilchard's love interest introduced in "Roley the Green Cat" and ended up having three kittens together.

Ready, Steady, Build!
Fox Cub (voiced by Kate Harbour) is a fox Roley befriends.

Reboot series
Cooper (voiced by Frank Welker) is a dog that Tilly looks after. Like Scruffty, he loves to chase Pilchard.
Stripy (voiced by Kate Harbour) is a female tiger shark pup who becomes Scoop's pet in "Scoop's Pet Shark".

Spud

Original series
Spud (voiced by Rob Rackstraw in the UK, the US version beginning with Project Build It, and by Alan Marriott in Seasons 1-9 in the US version of the original series) is a mischievous anthropomorphic scarecrow who lives at the farm and lives with Farmer Pickles. He makes trouble for Bob and the crew. He is the only character to not be a human, animal or vehicle. He likes to eat and scare crows away. His catchphrases are "Spud's on the job!", "Oh, yes, yessity yes!" and "Yes, Bob, sorry Bob."

Bob the Builder
Bob the Builder
Bob the Builder